Dujuan “Whisper” Richards (born 11 October 2005) is a Jamaican footballer who plays as a forward for Chelsea.

Early life
Richards was born in Port Royal.

Club career
Richards started his career with the Phoenix Football Academy in his native Jamaica, joining at the age of twelve. He also represented the Kingston College in Jamaica, and spent time with the Brooke House College's football academy in Leicestershire, England.

Following impressive performances with the Kingston College, scoring thirty-one goals and providing nineteen assists in the Manning Cup, he was invited to trial with English Premier League side Newcastle United in February 2023. After a successful two-week trial, and having rejected an offer from an unnamed Middle Eastern club, Richards was quoted as saying he was "expecting to hear positively” from the Magpies.

Despite the interest from both parties, fellow Premier League side Chelsea also made Richards an offer, and he reportedly signed a pre-contract deal with the club in March 2023.

International career
Richards' grandmother is English, making him eligible to represent England at international level.

Richards was called up to the senior national team for a friendly game against Trinidad and Tobago, with manager Heimir Hallgrímsson stating that he was "ready" to represent the nation, despite his young age. He went on to make his debut in the 1–0 loss.

Personal life
Richards hails from a sporting family, with uncle Nick playing basketball professionally in the NBA for the Charlotte Hornets. His father, Odile, also played basketball in Jamaica, while another uncle, O'Neil, represented the nation in cricket.

Career statistics

International

References

2005 births
Living people
Sportspeople from Kingston, Jamaica
Jamaican footballers
Jamaica international footballers
Jamaican people of English descent
Association football forwards
Chelsea F.C. players
Jamaican expatriate footballers
Jamaican expatriate sportspeople in England
Expatriate footballers in England